In geology, a melanosome is a dark, mafic mineral band formed in migmatite which is melting into a eutaxitic texture ; often, this leads to the formation of granite. The melanosomes form bands with leucosomes, and in that context may be described as schlieren or migmatitic.

See also
 Metamorphism

References

External links
metamorphic rock classification

Petrology